Alokdia High School is a secondary school in Madhupur Upazila, Tangail, Dhaka, Bangladesh. The school offers education for students ranging from six to Secondary School Certificate (approximately ages 7 to 15). With over 700 students, 50 of which reside in its two dormitories. The school is under the direct control of the Ministry of Education

History
Abul Hasan Chowdhury (The former state minister for Foreign Affairs of Bangladesh) founded the school in 1995.
President of the school governing body Abul Kashem Chowdhury. Since 1995 its focusing knowledge for all rural children.

Location
The school is located near the village of Alokdia, approximately 9 km southwest of Madhupur along the Tangail-Mymensingh Highway.

See also
 Madhupur Shahid Smrity Higher Secondary School
 Education in Bangladesh
 List of schools in Bangladesh

References

External links 
 Official Website 

High schools in Bangladesh
Education in Madhupur
1995 establishments in Bangladesh